Earleville is an unincorporated community in Cecil County, Maryland, United States. Earleville is located at the intersection of Maryland Route 282 and Grove Neck Road west of Cecilton.

Located at Earleville and listed on the National Register of Historic Places are: Bohemia Farm, Mount Harmon, Rose Hill, and St. Stephen's Episcopal Church.

References

External links
Cecil County

Unincorporated communities in Cecil County, Maryland
Unincorporated communities in Maryland